Ion is a data serialization language developed by Amazon. It may be represented by either a human-readable text form or a compact binary form. The text form is a superset of JSON; thus, any valid JSON document is also a valid Ion document.

Data types
As a superset of JSON, Ion includes the following data types
 : An empty value
 : Boolean values
 : Unicode text literals
 : Ordered heterogeneous collection of Ion values
 : Unordered collection of key/value pairs

The nebulous JSON 'number' type is strictly defined in Ion to be one of
 : Signed integers of arbitrary size
 : 64-bit IEEE binary-encoded floating point numbers
 : Decimal-encoded real numbers of arbitrary precision

Ion adds these types:
 : Date/time/time zone moments of arbitrary precision
 : Unicode symbolic atoms (aka identifiers)
 : Binary data of user-defined encoding
 : Text data of user-defined encoding
 : Ordered collections of values with application-defined semantics

Each Ion type supports a null variant, indicating a lack of value while maintaining a strict type (e.g.).

The Ion format permits annotations to any value in the form of symbols. Such annotations may be used as metadata for otherwise opaque data (such as a blob).

Implementations 

 Amazon supported library implementations
 C#
 Go Lang
 Python
 JS

Examples

Sample document
// comments are allowed in Ion files using the double forward slash 
{
  key: "value",   // key here is a symbol, it can also be a string as in JSON
  nums: 1_000_000, // equivalent to 1000000, use of underscores with numbers is more readable
  'A float value': 31415e-4,  // key is a value that contains spaces 
  "An int value": .int,
  annotated: age::35,     // age here is the annotation to number 35
  lists : 'hw grades'::[80, 85, 90], // any symbol can be used as an annotation 
  many_annot: I::have::many::annotations::true, // annotations are not nested, but rather, a list of annotations
  sexp: (this (is a [valid] "Ion") last::value 42) // Ion S-expressions, 
  _value: {{OiBTIKUgTyAASb8=}},
  _value: {{"a b"}}
}

Uses

 Amazon's Quantum Ledger Database (QLDB) stores data in Ion documents.
 PartiQL, an open source SQL-based query language also by Amazon, is built upon Ion. PartiQL supported queries are used by QLDB, S3Select.

Tooling and extensions 

 Ion Path Extractor API aims to combine the convenience of a DOM API with the speed of a streaming API. 
 IDE support 
 Eclipse
 IntelliJ
 Jackson data format module for Ion
 Apache Hive SerDe for Ion
 Ion Schema
 Specification
 Implementations
 Ion Hash defines an algorithm for constructing a hash for any Ion value.
 Specification
 Implementations

References

External links
 Ion specification
 Amazon supported language implementations
 Java API documentation
 C# implementation

Data serialization formats
Markup languages